Ali Manaj (born November 7, 1937 in Damës, Gjirokastër) is an Albanian politician.  He served as Chairman of the Assembly of the Republic of Albania from February 11, 1976 to December 25, 1978.

References

1937 births
Living people
People from Memaliaj
Speakers of the Parliament of Albania
Members of the Parliament of Albania